Abid Aziz Sheikh (born 26 April 1967) has been Justice of the Lahore High Court since 12 April 2013.He received his elementary and secondary education in Lahore. In 1987 he got his B.A. degree from Government College Lahore, Punjab, Pakistan. In 1990 he got LL.B degree with high grades from Law College University of Punjab, Pakistan. In 1992 he was selected for LL.M by the Punjab University and completed one year, however, in 1993 he proceeded to UK for LL.M. with (Specialization in Public Law) from Kings College University of London, United Kingdom. He enrolled as Member Lahore District Bar Association in 1991 and Advocate of the Lahore High Court and Member of Lahore High Court Bar Association in 1993. He was enrolled as an Advocate of the Supreme Court of Pakistan in 2006.

Justice Abid Aziz Sheikh, in 1993 established a Law Firm known as Aziz Law Associates with specialization in Corporate, Civil and Properties Law. In 1997, he joined as partner in Hamid Law Associates. During practice at the Bar, he rendered his services as Legal Advisor to various Government and non-Government Organizations. He also successfully conducted number of cases pertaining to various laws including Arbitration, Tax Matters, Corporate and project financing, Oil, Gas and Energy, Securities Market, Intellectual Property and Educational Institutions etc. Some of his reported judgments are as under:-

(1993 P.Crl.J 1340), (1994 CLC 913), (1994 CLC 1785), (1994 P.CRLJ 2550), (PLD (1995 Lahore 572), (1996 CLC 516), (1996 CLC 1469) (PLJ 1999 Lah 33), (2000 CLC 1818), (2000 YLR 2644), (2002 CLD 271), (2002 CLD 1252), (2002 CLD 271), (2002 CLD 1366), (2002 CLD 943), (PLD 2003 Lah629), (2003 CLD 952), (2003 CLD 584), (2003 YLR 1032), (2004 CLD 1632), (2004 CLD 1328), (2004 CLD 1465), (2005 CLD 404), HBL (2005 CLD 1749), (2005 CLD 941), (2005 CLD 941), (2005 CLD 1229), (2006 CLD 1), (2006 CLD 1553), (2006 CLD 1592), (2006 CLD 1130), (2006 SCMR 483), (2006 CLD 952), (2007 CLD 952), (2007 CLD 652), (PLD 2009 Lahore), (2010 PLC 93), (2010 MLD 800), (PLD 2010 SC 1165), (2012 CLC 1067)

Justice Abid Aziz Sheikh, while practicing at the Bar also rendered pro bono services. He has been Legal Advisor and Vice President of Punjab Squash Association. He was also one of the Trustees on Board of Trustees of M/s Akzonobel (Multinational Company successor of ICI) Pension Fund. He remained a visiting Lecturer in Punjab Law College, Lahore and TILS, Lahore, where he taught Constitution and Administrative Law. He also delivered lectures from time to time on working of Stock Exchanges, SECP laws and property laws in Pakistan at LUMS (short course for Executive MBA).

Justice Abid Aziz Sheikh, was elevated to the Bench of this Court on 12.04.2013. During his career as a Judge, Justice Abid Aziz Sheikh has rendered judgments on number of important issues. Some of his reported judgments are as under:-

(PLD 2014 Lah. 01), (2013) 108 Tax 330), (2013 PTD 2040), (2013) 198 Tax 330), (PLJ 2013 Tax Cases Lahore 217), (NLR 2013 Tax 121), (2013 PTD 1304), (PLD 2013 Lah. 607), (2013 PTD 2005), (PLJ 2013 Tax Cases Lah. 24), (2013 PTD 2005), (2013 108 Tax 221), (2014 MLD 130), (PLJ 2013 Lah. 601), (KLR 2013 CC 306), (2013) 108 Tax 221), (2013 PTD 2077), (2013 CLD 2080)

References

1967 births
Living people
Judges of the Lahore High Court
Pakistani judges